Akramabad may refer to:
 Akramabad, East Azerbaijan
 Akramabad, Kerman
 Akramabad, Sistan and Baluchestan
 Akramabad, Tehran
 Akramabad, Yazd